Grand Ayatollah Khalil Mobasher Kashani (Persian:  خلیل مبشر کاشانی) (born 1951) is an Iranian Twelver Shi'a Marja.

He studied in seminaries in Qum, Iran under Grand Ayatollah Mohammad-Reza Golpaygani and Jawad Tabrizi.

See also
List of Maraji

References

External links
وب سايت دفتر مرجع عاليقدر حضرت آيت الله خليل مبشر کاشاني
خاطراتي از آيت الله مبشر كاشاني 
A unique Fatwā:  روزه داران دیابتی میتوانند آب بنوشند

Iranian grand ayatollahs
Iranian Islamists
Shia Islamists
1951 births
Living people